Vancouver Metro can refer to:

Metro Vancouver, the metropolitan area surrounding and including Vancouver.
SkyTrain (Vancouver), the rapid transit system in Vancouver.